Pálffy Palace is a Baroque-style palace in the Old Town of Bratislava, on Ventúrska street. It was built by Count Leopold Pálffy in 1747. It has an interesting portal with a relief reflecting the military career of the count as a general in the army of Empress Maria Theresa.

During the reconstruction of the palace, parts of a Gothic building were found in walls at the interior of the building. Roman and Celtic finds were uncovered through archaeological research in the basement.

The palace used to contain a mint in the past. In 1762, Wolfgang Amadeus Mozart played a concert here at the age of six.

From 1993 to 2012, the palace was used as the Austrian embassy.

References

External links

 About the palace on the Austrian embassy website 

Houses completed in 1747
Palaces in Bratislava
Baroque palaces in Slovakia